Sandar (until 1932 named Sandeherred) is a former municipality in Vestfold county (Norwegian: fylke), Norway.

Sandar was established as a municipality January 1, 1838 (see formannskapsdistrikt). It was merged with Sandefjord and became its northeastern suburb on January 1, 1968.

Sandar was, basically, the rural part of the current municipality, although it had its share of industry, too, mostly located close to the former border between the two municipalities. Thus many famous corporations now associated with Sandefjord had their origins in Sandar, e.g. Jotun, Framnæs Mekaniske Værksted and Sandar Fabrikker (a chemical plant dedicated to refining whale oil).

With the merger, the combined district took the name of the much smaller town and, effectively, made Sandar disappear from history.

The name
The municipality (originally the parish) was named after the old farm Sande (Norse Sandar), since the first church was built here. The name is the plural form of sandr m 'sand; area with sandy soil'.

The municipality, established 1838, was named Sandeherred 'the herred (rural district, municipality) of Sande'. (See also the names Kvinnherad and Sauherad.)

Location

Sandar was located in the southern half of the county called Vestfold, by the coast. To get there, directions are as for Sandefjord - by road from the south or the north via E18; via train; by ferry from Strömstad in Sweden, or via air to Torp airport from places such as Amsterdam and Copenhagen.

References
Berg, Lorens. Bygdebok for Sandeherred, 1918 (index and chapter headings online at vestfold-slekt.net) 

Former municipalities of Norway
Sandefjord
Populated places established in 1838
1838 establishments in Norway